Kristi Allik (born 6 February 1952) is a Canadian music educator and composer.

Biography
Born Kristi Anne Allik on 6 February 1952 in Toronto, Ontario, Canada and received a Bachelor of Music from the University of Toronto, a Master of Fine Arts degree from Princeton University and doctorate from the University of Southern California. She studied composition under John Weinzweig, Oskar Morawetz, Lothar Klein, Gustav Ciamaga, James Hopkins, Frederick Leseman and Milton Babbitt.

After completing her studies, Allik taught at the University of Victoria (1980–81) and the University of Western Ontario (1982–87) before she settled in Kingston, Ontario, and took a position as Associate Professor of Music at Queen's University where she taught electronic music, composition and jazz until her retirement in July 2013. She was also the Director of the Electronic Music Studios and the Computer Laboratory of Music Applications at Queen's University. Allik's compositions have been performed in Canada, the United States, Europe, Cuba and South America. She has also published articles and essays in professional publications.

Awards and honours
Grants and awards from the Canada Arts Council, Ontario Arts Council, SSHRC, Canadian Federation of University Women and the Chalmers Foundation
Honourable mention from Ars Electronica competition
Honourable mention Bourges International Music competition 
"The Music and Kristi Allik and Friends", Faculty Artist Series Performance, Queen's University School of Music, 26 January 2014, Grant Hall, Queen's University.  Retirement concert in celebration of career of Professor Emerita, Kristi Allik.

Works
Selected works include:
Alambic Rhythms (23:00 / 1987) — Kristi Allik for tape and multi-image (Images: Robert Mulder)
Cometose (27:00 / 1986) — Kristi Allik for tape and multi-image (Images: Robert Mulder)
Electronic Purgatory — Kristi Allik, Robert Mulder
Electronic Zen Garden — Kristi Allik, Bentley Jarvis
Integra (10:00 / 1986) — Kristi Allik for tape and multi-image (Images: Robert Mulder)
Introspection (7:00 / 1983) — Kristi Allik
Rhapsody : for clarinet and electroacoustic tape (1986)
Rondeau (22:00 / 1983) — Kristi Allik for tape and multi-image (Images: Robert Mulder)

Discography
Allik's works have been recorded and issued on CD, including:
Twentieth Century Canadian Chamber Music - Audio CD (1991) by Clifford Crawley, David Keane, John Burge, Kristi Allik RFRC Clarke, ASIN: B000XOO4K0.
The Skyharp (The Skyline Variations) (1997) MAMA CD-M001
The Synergy, MAMA CD-M002
Ecotonal Landscapes (1998) MAMA CD-M003
The~infoweaver (2001) MAMA CD-M005
Leark (2002) Live Electroacoustic Research Kitchen
Electricities = Electricités (2003) CMCDS-S4 CMC
DISContact! III (2003) PeP 007 Productions électro Productions
Expurge (2004) LEARK (Live Electroacoustic Research Kitchen, Queen's University, Kingston, Ont.: Kristi Allik, David McCallum, Mike Cassells, Robert Mulder)
Raras (2009) Conarte

References

1952 births
Living people
Canadian people of Estonian descent
20th-century classical composers
21st-century classical composers
Canadian music educators
Women classical composers
University of Toronto alumni
Princeton University alumni
USC Thornton School of Music alumni
Academic staff of the University of Victoria
Academic staff of the University of Western Ontario
Academic staff of Queen's University at Kingston
Canadian classical composers
Musicians from Kingston, Ontario
Musicians from Toronto
Canadian women composers
Women educators
20th-century Canadian composers
Women music educators
Canadian women in electronic music
20th-century women composers
21st-century women composers
20th-century Canadian women musicians